"Only Human" is a song by American pop rock group the Jonas Brothers. It was released on July 2, 2019, through Republic Records as the third and final single from their fifth studio album Happiness Begins (2019). The group co-wrote the song with its producer Shellback. "Only Human" is a reggae song that features twinkling keys, groovy bass, brass and percussive cadences in its production.

Upon release, "Only Human" was met with generally favourable reviews from music critics, who praised its music style and "textured" production. Commercially, the song peaked at number 18 on both the US Billboard Hot 100 and the Canadian Hot 100. The song reached top 40 in charts of numerous territories including Australia, Hungary, Ireland, Netherlands, New Zealand, Spain, Flanders and Wallonia regions of Belgium. It was certified gold in Belgium, platinum in France and double platinum in Canada.

An accompanying '80s-themed music video directed by Anthony Mandler was released on August 13, 2019. It depicts the Jonas Brothers singing and dancing in a crowded nightclub. To promote the song, the Jonas Brothers performed "Only Human" on several occasions and also included it on the set list for their Happiness Begins Tour (2019-2020).

Background and composition

Following the success of the singles "Sucker" and "Cool", "Only Human" was serviced to the US contemporary hit radio format by Republic Records, on July 2, 2019, as the third single from the Jonas Brothers' fifth studio album Happiness Begins. On July 5, it was released to Italy's contemporary hit radio. The group wrote "Only Human" with its producer Shellback. Shellback also played bass guitar, drums, keyboards and tambourines. It was mixed by Serban Ghenea and John Hanes who also served as studio personnel. "Only Human" was the last song written for Happiness Begins after the album's songwriters and producers Max Martin and Shellback approached the band. During an interview with Apple Music, Joe Jonas recalled writing and recording the track mostly via FaceTime.

"Only Human" is a reggae-pop song featuring an '80s tropical groove and lasts for three minutes and three seconds. Its production includes "twinkling keys", "groovy bass line", brass and percussive cadences. In terms of musical notation, the song is composed in  time and the key of D minor at moderately slow tempo varying between 92 and 96 beats per minute. The band's vocals span a range of G4 to D6. Lyrically, the song is about the "only human" instinct to "having harmless fun": "It's only human, you know that it's real / So why would you fight or try to deny the way that you feel?", urging the listeners to stop thinking about anything else and just dance.

Critical reception
Upon release, "Only Human" was met with generally favourable reviews from music critics. In a positive review, Olivia Horn of Pitchfork praised the composition of the song, noting that "the reggae beat [...] works surprisingly well". Chloe Gilke of Uproxx wrote that the "textured" production was like a "perfectly-fit puzzle" and deemed the song as an album highlight. Christopher Thiessen of Consequence of Sound criticized the lyrical content and wrote that "the sincerity in performance and deep devotion to melody-crafting" made up for it. Mike Nied at Idolator described the song as "another banger" and that it has potential to be song of the summer. Billboard magazine ranked it 40th on their 2019 year-end list.

Commercial performance
Commercially, "Only Human" peaked at number 18 on both the US Billboard Hot 100 and the Canadian Hot 100. The song quickly became pop radio's most added song of the week dated July 2, 2019, picked up by 61 Mediabase-monitored pop stations. Two weeks later, the song returned again to the top of the add board, picked up by 42 pop stations. The song reached the top 10 of the Mediabase Hot AC chart on the week dated August 12, 2019. The song debuted atop the Canada Hot AC chart and charted on the Canada AC chart at number 11. In addition, the song peaked at number three on the Billboard Pop Songs and Adult Pop Songs charts. It also entered the US Adult Contemporary Chart at number 10 and Dance/Mix Show Airplay at number 12. The song charted at number 38 in Australia, number 64 in the UK, number four in Spain and number ten in both the Flanders and Wallonia regions of Belgium. In Europe, the song impacted the airplay charts in numerous territories, reaching top ten peaks in Germany, Netherlands, Poland, Romania and Slovakia. It was certified gold in Belgium, platinum in France and double platinum in Canada.

Promotion and music video 
An accompanying music video was uploaded to Jonas Brothers' official YouTube channel on August 13, 2019. The '80s-themed video was directed by Anthony Mandler and produced by Kim Bradshaw of Black Hand Cinema. The music video was filmed in New York. The visual opens inside a nightclub having a giant disco-ball and ceramic horse statues where the Jonas Brothers are performing on stage wearing opaque sunglasses and colourful retro outfits alongside professional ladder dancer Declan McDonough. They are surrounded by a crowd of enthusiastic club-goers who are "head-bopping", "finger-snapping" and singing along to the group. The clip is interspersed with grainy footage of the group playing with rotary telephones and synchronized dancing of the audience beneath the neon disco lights. Over the course of the video, the brothers and the crowd take to the streets where Joe Jonas dances and sings, standing on top of a vintage yellow NYC taxi. The entire video alternates between filmy, hazy filtered shots at the club and the street. The final scene sees the driver of the cab shouting at them for blocking the traffic. Katrina Rees of Celemix praised the video's "nostalgic take on a classic era" which she felt "fit[ted] in perfectly with the old school vibe of the song."

The Jonas Brothers performed "Only Human" for the first time on The Tonight Show Starring Jimmy Fallon on June 13, 2019. On July 18, 2019, they performed the song on Late Night with Seth Meyers. On August 26, 2019, the band performed the song at the 2019 MTV Video Music Awards, which marked their first performance at the awards show in 10 years. They performed the song again on October 8, 2019 on The Ellen Show. "Only Human" was included in the set list of the band's tenth concert tour Happiness Begins Tour (2019-2020).

Credits and personnel
Credits adapted from Tidal.

 Nick Jonas – vocals, songwriter
 Joe Jonas – vocals, songwriter
 Kevin Jonas – vocals, songwriter
 Shellback – backing vocals, producer, songwriter, programmer, bass guitar, drums, keyboards, tambourine 
 Peter Karlsson – vocal producer
 Michael Engström – bass guitar
 Wojtek Goral – alto saxophone, flute
 Tomas Jonsson – baritone saxophone, tenor saxophone
 Mattias Bylund – bassoon, horn
 Mia Samuelsson – flugelhorn
 Nils-Petter Ankarblom – horn, horn arranger
 Jason McNab – tambourine 
 Jimmy Carr – tambourine 
 Kasper Komar – tambourine 
 Robert Mollard – tambourine 
 Peter Noos Johansson – trombone
 Janne Bjerger – trumpet
 Magnus Johansson – trumpet
 Serban Ghenea – mixer
 John Hanes – mix engineer

Charts

Weekly charts

Year-end charts

Certifications

Release history

References

External links
 

2019 songs
American reggae songs
Jonas Brothers songs
Reggae fusion songs
Song recordings produced by Shellback (record producer)
Songs written by Kevin Jonas
Songs written by Nick Jonas
Songs written by Shellback (record producer)
Songs written by Joe Jonas
2019 singles
Music videos directed by Anthony Mandler